Robert Alan Baines (born 15 November 1952) is an Australian actor. He has starred in many television shows including Water Rats and Home and Away as school principal Martin Bartlett.

Filmography
 2015 – The Dalfram Dispute 1938 : Pig Iron Bob, as Robert Menzies during the Dalfram dispute of 1938
 2011 – Crownies as Dr. Wally Kos
 2010 – Uninhabited as Jackson
 2008 – Home and Away as Martin Bartlett
 2007 – U-turn as Ted
 2007 – The Final Winter as Ned
 2006 – Tight as a Drum as Dean Fowler
 2006 – Alex's Party as Tony
 2006 – Jindabyne as Doctor #1
 2005 – Deck Dogz as Headmaster Clatwell
 2003 – Blue Heelers as Ian Hammond
 2001–2002 – BackBerner as Spokesman for Liberal Party
 2001 – All Saints as Phil Harper
 2001 – Outriders as Bryce
 2000 – Water Rats as Hugh Costello

References

External links 
 
 http://backtothebay.net/features/behind-the-scenes-29th-october.shtml

1952 births
20th-century Australian male actors
21st-century Australian male actors
Australian male film actors
Australian male soap opera actors
Living people
Male actors from Sydney
People educated at Sydney Boys High School